Stephen Emmer (/ˈstɛfən/ STEF-ən; born 28 January 1958 in Amsterdam) is a Dutch composer, arranger, producer, sound designer and musician. Best known as a composer for Dutch television and film, Emmer has released four albums as a solo artist, each with a different theme or concept. Vogue Estate  released in 1982, is the soundtrack for an imaginary film; 2007’s  Recitement  is a spoken word album of poetry and prose; International Blue, released in 2014, is a tribute to pop crooners. In 2017 Emmer released Home Ground, a neo-soul album that addresses social issues related to origin.

Emmer is closely associated with the Dutch Ultra movement of late 1970s and early 1980s. He was a member of Minny Pops and the Lotus Eaters, co-founded the music magazine Vinyl  and hosted and produced RadioNome for Dutch broadcasting organization VPRO.

Early life and education
Emmer was born in Amsterdam. His parents are mother Roekie Aronds, actress and ballet dancer and father Fred Emmer, an anchorman for NOS Journaal. In the late 70s he played in a free jazz group and a symphonic rock group with Mathilde Santing and Dennis Duchart.

Music

1979-1984: Minny Pops, Radionome, Vinyl, Vogue Estate
In 1979,  Emmer joined Minny Pops, an avant-garde post-punk band central to the Dutch Ultra movement, and co-founded Vinyl, a music magazine launched in 1981. In January 1980, Minny Pops opened for Joy Division and were subsequently signed by Factory Records. In 1981, they recorded their first single for Factory, Dolphin's Spurt, with Joy Division producer Martin Hannett. The first Dutch band to do a Peel Session, Minny Pops toured the UK several times; Emmer, who had joined the band as a guitarist, performed and recorded on both guitar and bass guitar on the album "Drastic Measures, Drastic Movement". He also hosted and produced radio programs for the Dutch broadcasting organization VPRO, including Radionome, which aired experimental music and live in-studio performances. Emmer's music was included on Radionome compilation albums issued by VPRO. In 1982, Emmer recorded Vogue Estate, a soundtrack for an imaginary film. Although mainly an instrumental, it included two songs with vocals:  "Wish On" with Billy MacKenzie (of The Associates) and "Never Share" with Martha Ladley (from Martha and the Muffins). Michael Dempsey, formerly of The Cure, played bass on Vogue Estate, which was produced by Emmer with Flood. Emmer also performed with the Associates in 1982. In 1984 Dempsey and Emmer joined The Lotus Eaters.

2006 – present: Recitement, International Blue, Home Ground
Working with producer Tony Visconti, Emmer composed music to accompany poetry and prose voiced by authors and performers for the album Recitement, released on the Dutch Supertracks label in 2007. Some were new recordings, made specifically for Recitement, and others were previously recorded.  Its 17 tracks included texts by Yoko Ono, Allen Ginsberg, Paul Theroux, Thomas Hardy, Jorge Luis Borges, Ken Nordine, Charles Baudelaire and Samuel Beckett, voiced by Lou Reed, Richard Burton, Sylvia Kristel, Michael Parkinson and Hugo Claus among others.

In 2014, again working with Visconti, Emmer released International Blue, tribute to pop crooning. A collection of "lushly orchestrated tales of heartbreak", it featured vocalists Midge Ure from Ultravox, Glenn Gregory of Heaven 17, Liam McKahey of Cousteau and Neil Crossley. Gregory collaborated on four of the album's ten songs, including "Untouchable", a "darkly sumptuous" tribute to Billy MacKenzie. For the Christmas holiday, Julian Lennon recorded a seasonal version of the album's "Sleep for England". De Telegraaf wrote that International Blue was "the most beautifully orchestrated, arranged and composed album of the year".

In 2017, Emmer released Home Ground, a retro-soul album inspired by the "music-with-a-message movement of the 1970s", such as Marvin Gaye's What's Going On. The album addresses social issues related to "homeground". Commenting on Homeground in a 2017 interview Emmer said:  "Where your own home ground is; is it in your own country, your city or village, your house or is it close to your loved ones or is it in your own heart or head?" A benefit album for the charity War Child featured vocalists including Chaka Khan, Leon Ware, Patti Austin, Frank McComb and Andy Bey.
Review Soultracks.
Emmer is the founder of eStation, a media production studio. He is the music director for Holiday on Ice, and the Cartoon Network's   live show, which launched in 2018.

The album Maison Melody, self-recorded by Emmer during the Covid-19 lockdown, was released for free in 2020 to emotionally support the people financially affected by self-isolations.

Awards
Home Ground, Golden Global Music Award 2017 
Humanitarian Award, Global Music Awards, 2018

Discography

Albums

Singles

References

External links
 

1958 births
Living people
Dutch composers
Dutch music arrangers
Dutch record producers
Musicians from Amsterdam
Sound designers
The Lotus Eaters (band) members